Live at The Unitarian Church is a live album released in 2012 by the Irish band Halves.

Recording
The album was recorded live at the Unitarian Church (Dublin city centre) on 9 December 2011, by live engineer Ciaran Mangan. It features updated arrangements of songs from 'It Goes, It Goes' plus songs from their first two EP releases.

Release
On 21 April 2012 Halves released 'Live at The Unitarian Church' on vinyl for Record Store Day. This was pressed on a limited edition of clear 12" vinyl (250 copies) and sold through independent Irish record shops.

Track listing
All tracks written by Halves.
 "Land/Sea/People" – 5:32
 "Blood Branches" – 3:37
 "Haunt Me When I'm Drowsy"– 4:36
 "Medals"– 4:50
 "May Your Enemies Never Find Happiness"– 6:10
 "Darling, You'll Meet Your Maker" – 5:20
 "Growing & Glow" – 4:19
 "Tony Hart's Revenge Theme" – 3:33
 "Mountain Bell ('download only' track)" – 7:21

References

External links
 Halves site
 Facebook
 Discogs page
 YouTube
 Twitter

Record Store Day releases
Halves (band) albums
2012 live albums